Patelloida striata is a species of sea snail, a true limpet, a marine gastropod mollusk in the family Lottiidae, one of the families of true limpets.

Description
The length of the shell attains 30.4 mm.

Distribution
This marine species occurs off Indonesia

References

 Quoy, H. E. Th. & Gaimard, P., 1834 Mollusques. Zoologie. In Voyage de découvertes de l'Astrolabe, exécuté par ordre du Roi, pendant les années 1826-1827-1828-1829, sous le commandement de M. J. Dumont d'Urville, vol. 3(1), p. 1-366
 Yip, S. Y. (1978). The ecology of coastal reclamation in Hong Kong. Mphil thesis. The University of Hong Kong.
 Nakano T. & Ozawa T. (2007). Worldwide phylogeography of limpets of the order Patellogastropoda: molecular, morphological and paleontological evidence. Journal of Molluscan Studies 73(1): 79–99.
 Liu, J.Y. [Ruiyu] (ed.). (2008). Checklist of marine biota of China seas. China Science Press. 1267 pp. 

Lottiidae
Gastropods described in 1834